Phillips Square is a public square located in Downtown Montreal, Quebec, Canada. The Square was established in 1842 thanks to a gift from Alfred Phillips to the city of Montreal.

History
In 1842, the square was first laid out in what was then a wealthy residential area on the fringe of the city of Montreal. The first merchant to open a business on Phillips Square was Alfred Joyce; “the high class caterer and confectioner” and one-time mayor of the town of Outremont who built an elegant shop on the south side of the square in 1878. In 1891, Morgan's department store established itself on the north side of the square. That site is of particular interest to visitors from the United 
States because Confederate President Jefferson Davis sent his family to live in Montreal during the American Civil War. A brass plaque installed on the west side of the store, today called The Bay, was dedicated to his memory. Davis came in 1867 to stay in John Lovell’s house, which then stood on the site. The plaque was removed in 2017.

The head office of Henry Birks and Sons was built soon after on the west side of the square in 1894. The fast food outlet on the corner of the east side of Phillips Square was the site of Montreal’s first art gallery, which was inaugurated by the governor general of Canada, Sir John Campbell, 9th Duke of Argyll (also known as the Marquis of Lorne) in 1879. When its collection grew, it eventually moved to the present-day Montreal Museum of Fine Arts. On the south side of the square, where Alfred Joyce once had his pastry shop, is the Canada Cement Building, built in 1921. Designed by Barott and Blackader, the dignified 10-storey building was the first office tower to be built completely of reinforced concrete. Canada Cement was founded by Max Aitken, later Lord Beaverbrook, and Barott convinced him to use concrete in the building of his head office to advertise his cement-based products. The building was considered avant-garde when it opened because it was the first skyscraper in Montreal to have an underground parking garage, and there were then only a few automobiles on the road.

On August 31, 2012, a memorial to the victims of the Blue Bird Café fire, which occurred nearby in 1972, was unveiled by the city of Montreal on the south side of the square to mark the 40th anniversary of the tragedy.

In 2022, Provencher_Roy transformed part of Sainte-Catherine Street West into a pedestrian oriented hub. At the heart of the project sits Phillips Square a newly expanded public space. The plan eliminates street parking and drastically widens the sidewalks, flipping the proportion of space allocated to cars and pedestrians to turn it into a place for people. Bronze plates in the street serve as urban markers, identifying the grand turn-of-the-century department stores and commercial buildings that lend this area its storied heritage. The design also recenters Phillips Square as an integral part of the downtown core as envisioned in the 1841 Phillips Plan. A contemporary interpretation of the English Garden Square, the space is newly expanded thanks to wider sidewalks, lush plantings and open sightlines, which offer picturesque views over the built environment and surrounding landscape. The monument to Edward VII is showcased with new uplighting, surrounded by integrated urban furniture and a programmable water feature. In addition, the project increases vegetation in the Square by 46% and plants 14 times the number of current trees.

Monuments
The square features a bronze monument of King Edward VII, who ruled from 1901 to 1910. He visited Montreal in 1860, while he was still the Prince of Wales, and opened the Victoria Bridge. The statue was designed by Louis-Philippe Hébert and was erected in 1914. The four allegorical figures at the base of the monument represent Peace, the Four Founding Nations, Abundance, and Liberty.

Gallery

References

Downtown Montreal
Squares in Montreal